Omar Cabezas Lacayo (born 1950 in León, Nicaragua) is a Nicaraguan author, revolutionary and politician. He was a commander in the guerrilla war against Anastasio Somoza Debayle, and prominent Sandinista party member. He is perhaps most famous outside of Nicaragua for his book entitled Fire From the Mountain (published in Nicaragua as La montaña es algo mas que una inmensa estepa verde), which is a personal account of his days as a guerrilla fighting the Somoza dynasty.

This personal testimony can be read as a bildungsroman, or novela de formación in Spanish. In it Cabezas learns about life, about social injustice, about women, and about the difficulty of overthrowing a dictatorship. He struggles against nature; an infection he suffers from being on the mountain, puts his life in jeopardy. He overcomes numerous obstacles in his quest to bring down the brutal US-supported thirty year Somoza dynasty in an environment defined by terror and hope (such as the violent shootout between the military and the Sandinista militant Julio Buitrago). Cabezas' story is about an idealist man in a time when it meant something to be heroic. It is also known for being the first major work in the Nicaraguan vernacular, rather than formal Spanish.

Cabezas would later write a sequel, Canción de amor para los hombres, but it is generally regarded as lacking the electricity of Fire From the Mountain.

Cabezas was a member of the Sandinista government, until he was stripped of his positions in 1987, following disagreement with other leading Sandinistas. He was elected to the National Assembly in the 1990 elections, and continues as a public figure to this day.

Notes

Further reading
Cabezas, Omar & Dora María Téllez Argüello. La Insurrección de las paredes: pintas y graffiti de Nicaragua.  Managua: Editorial Nueva Nicaragua, 1984.
Cabezas, Omar. Fire from the Mountain: The Making of a Sandinista. Trans. Kathleen Weaver. New York: New American Library, 1985.
---. Canción de amor para los hombres. Managua: Editorial Nueva Nicaragua, 1988.
O'Conner, Patricia. T. The New York Times: Book Review of Fire From the Mountain, Volume 91: July 13 '86, p. 34.
Orr, Brianne. "From Machista to New Man?: Omar Cabezas Negotiates Manhood from the Mountain in Nicaragua." Ciberletras 22 (December 2009): n/p.
Randall, Margaret. "Conversation with Omar Cabazas". Risking a Somersault in the Air: Conversations with Nicaraguan Writers. Trans. Christina Mills. Willimantic: Curbstone Press, 1984: pp. 119–139.
Skylar, Zachary. The Nation: Book Review of Fire From the Mountain, Volume 243 (December 2, 1986): p. 743.
Schaffer, Deborah, Director. Fire from the Mountain (Videorecording). New York: First Run Features, 198?.

1950 births
Living people
People from León, Nicaragua
Nicaraguan male writers
Sandinista National Liberation Front politicians
Members of the National Assembly (Nicaragua)
People of the Nicaraguan Revolution